Revolutionary Left Union (in Spanish: Unión de Izquierda Revolucionaria), was an electoral front in Peru founded in 1980 by Communist Party of Peru (Red Fatherland), Revolutionary Vanguard (Communist Proletarian) and National Liberation Front. UNIR participated on the lists of IU from the municipal elections 1980 to 1993.

Political parties established in 1980
Defunct left-wing political party alliances
Defunct political party alliances in Peru
Communist parties in Peru
Peru